Redwood City is a city on the San Francisco Peninsula in Northern California's Bay Area, approximately  south of San Francisco, and  northwest of San Jose. Redwood City's history spans its earliest inhabitation by the Ohlone people to being a port for lumber and other goods. The county seat of San Mateo County in the heart of Silicon Valley, Redwood City is home to several global technology companies including Oracle, Electronic Arts, Evernote, Box, and Informatica. The city's population was 84,292 according to the 2020 census. The Port of Redwood City is the only deepwater port on San Francisco Bay south of San Francisco.

A major watercourse draining much of Redwood City is Redwood Creek, to which several significant river deltas connect, the largest of which is Westpoint Slough.

History

The earliest known inhabitants of the area which was to become Redwood City were the Ohlone who were present when the Spanish claimed the land and established missions.

Redwood City incorporated in 1867, being the first city in San Mateo County to do so; it has remained the county seat since the county's formation in 1856. The land had been part of the Rancho de las Pulgas granted to the Argüello family in 1835 by the Mexican government. Their control was challenged after the Mexican–American War when California became part of the United States. The family lawyer, Simon M. Mezes, in 1854 defended the claim somewhat successfully and was allowed to buy the part of the estate that is now Redwood City. Mezes sold some of the land to people already squatting on it along the banks of Redwood Creek and named the settlement "Mezesville." Though the city did not keep that name, Mezes Park still exists on land that Mezes had given for open space.

In 1907, Eikichi and Sadakusi Enomoto, Japanese immigrant brothers, grew what may perhaps have been the first commercially grown chrysanthemums in the United States in Redwood City. In 1926, the chamber of commerce proclaimed the city the "Chrysanthemum Center of the World" though the internment of Japanese Americans in 1941 and other factors would contribute to the end of flower growing as a major industry in the city.

Geography 
Redwood City stretches from the San Francisco Bay towards the Santa Cruz Mountains between San Carlos to the northwest and Atherton to the southeast with Woodside to the southwest.  It is divided by Highway 101 and further inland El Camino Real on the northwest–southeast axis and Woodside Road on the north-northeast/south-southwest axis.  Locally, the former two are regarded as north–south and the latter east/west, as 101 and El Camino connects Redwood City to San Francisco and San Jose and Woodside Road runs from San Francisco Bay to the Santa Cruz Mountains.

Neighborhoods include Bair Island to the northeast of Highway 101. The northern planned community of Redwood Shores, also to the northeast of Highway 101, is part of Redwood City, although it is not possible to travel by road from one to the other without passing through the neighboring city of San Carlos, or through Belmont via San Mateo County. Stretching along Highway 101 to the southeast of Woodside Road is Friendly Acres, further inland and still to the southeast of Woodside Road are Redwood Village and then Redwood Oaks.  Most neighborhoods are to the northwest of Woodside Road and southwest of Highway 101.  Centennial, Downtown, and Stambaugh Heller are adjacent to 101.  Next inland are Edgewood, Mt. Carmel, Central and Palm then Canyon, Eagle Hill, Roosevelt, and Woodside Plaza.  Furthest inland is Farm Hills (or Farm Hill).

Neighborhoods associated with Redwood City but not part of the incorporated city include Emerald Lake Hills  and Kensington Square inland and to the north and 
North Fair Oaks to the southeast. Palomar Park, just north of Emerald Hills and east of San Carlos' Crestview area, is another Redwood City neighborhood that is formally part of unincorporated San Mateo County.  Although Redwood City has a large middle class, the southeastern section of Redwood City strongly resembles working-class North Fair Oaks in both demographic makeup and income level.

Downtown 

In an attempt to revitalize Redwood City's downtown, city officials decided to consider development. In February 1999, the San Mateo County History Museum opened inside the old San Mateo County Courthouse in downtown Redwood City. The courthouse had been built in 1910 and in the late '30s an addition was built in front of the original structure, obscuring the view. As part of the revitalization, this addition was torn down and replaced with a large courtyard flanked by water fountains on either side, leading to the main steps of the courthouse.  The courthouse's glass dome is lit at night and changes colors every 11 seconds.

In August 2006, a 20-screen theater and various shops opened in a prime downtown location. The theater complex boasts restaurant and retail space at street level and a two-level underground parking structure.

Climate
Redwood City, along with most of the Bay Area, enjoys a mild Mediterranean climate (Köppen climate classification Csb), with warm, dry summers and cool, relatively wet winters. The National Weather Service, which maintains both a forecast center and a cooperative office in Redwood City, reports that December is the coolest month and July is the warmest month.

There are an average of 62.1 days with measurable precipitation. Snow flurries have been observed on rare occasions; there was some minor snow accumulation in May 1935, January 1962, and February 1976.

Demographics

2010
The 2010 United States Census reported that Redwood City had a population of 76,815. The racial makeup of Redwood City was 46,255 (60.2%) White, 1,881 (2.4%) African American, 511 (0.7%) Native American, 8,216 (10.7%) Asian, 795 (1.0%) Pacific Islander, 14,967 (19.5%) from other races, and 4,190 (5.5%) from two or more races. Hispanic or Latino of any race were 29,810 persons (38.8%). Non-Hispanic Whites number 31,982 (40.9%).

The Census reported that 75,268 people (98.0% of the population) lived in households, 408 (0.5%) lived in non-institutionalized group quarters, and 1,139 (1.5%) were institutionalized.

There were 27,957 households, out of which 10,045 (35.9%) had children under the age of 18 living in them, 13,642 (48.8%) were opposite-sex married couples living together, 3,139 (11.2%) had a female householder with no husband present, 1,461 (5.2%) had a male householder with no wife present. There were 1,818 (6.5%) unmarried opposite-sex partnerships, and 288 (1.0%) same-sex married couples or partnerships. 7,411 households (26.5%) were made up of individuals, and 2,401 (8.6%) had someone living alone who was 65 years of age or older. The average household size was 2.69. There were 18,242 families (65.3% of all households); the average family size was 3.26.

There were 18,193 people (23.7%) under the age of 18, 5,981 people (7.8%) aged 18 to 24, 24,819 people (32.3%) aged 25 to 44, 19,710 people (25.7%) aged 45 to 64, and 8,112 people (10.6%) who were 65 years of age or older. The median age was 36.7 years. For every 100 females, there were 99.2 males. For every 100 females age 18 and over, there were 98.1 males.

The homeowner vacancy rate was 1.3%; the rental vacancy rate was 3.9%. 37,757 people (49.2% of the population) lived in owner-occupied housing units and 37,511 people (48.8%) lived in rental housing units.

2000
In 2000, there were 75,402 people, 27,423 households and 17,898 families residing in the city.

There were 27,680 households, out of which 31.5% had children under the age of 18 living with them, 44.4% were married couples living together, 14.7% had a female householder with no husband present, and 40.2% were non-families. 31.5% of all households were made up of individuals, and 6.3% had someone living alone who was 65 years of age or older.  The average household size was 4.62 and the average family size was 4.80.

In the city, the population was spread out, with 30.6% under the age of 18, 14.7% from 18 to 24, 33.3% from 25 to 44, 17.4% from 45 to 64, and 7.4% who were 65 years of age or older.  The median age was 28 years. For every 100 females, there were 103.2 males.  For every 100 females age 18 and over, there were 101.4 males.

According to a 2009 estimate, the median income for a household in the city was $69,679, and the median income for a family was $77,964. Disposable income is relatively constant when Redwood City is compared with the rest of the country. Males had a median income of $47,345 versus $44,125 for females. The per capita income for the city was $31,042.  About 8.4% of families and 10.2% of the population were below the poverty line, including 11.1% of those under age 18 and 9.4% of those age 65 or over.

Government

Redwood City's charter provides for a councilor-manager form of government. The City Council appoints the City Manager and adopts policies, which the City Manager is expected to implement. The City Manager appoints and manages most of Redwood City's department heads (the City Clerk and City Attorney being notable exceptions).

The City Council seats are currently held by Mayor Jeff Gee (District 1), Vice Mayor Lissette Espinoza-Guernica (District 3), Alicia C. Aguirre (District 7), Kaia Eakin (District 5), Diane Howard (District 6), Elmer Martinez Saballos (District 4), and Chris Sturken (District 2). The current City Manager is Melissa Stevenson Diaz.

According to the California Secretary of State, as of February 10, 2019, Redwood City has 41,866 registered voters. Of those, 21,213 (50.1%) are registered Democrats, 6,249 (14.9%) are registered Republicans, and 12,777 (30.5%) have declined to state a political party.

Landmarks
 Union Cemetery, State Historical Landmark #816
 Fox Theatre
 Lathrop House
 Sequoia High School

Parks
Preserves include Bair Island Ecological Preserve (State) and the Don Edwards National Wildlife Refuge on the shoreline. Edgewood County Park known for its wildflowers is towards the Santa Cruz Mountains with entrances off Edgewood Road and Cañada Road.

City parks include
 Andrew Spinas Park – 2nd Ave./Bay Rd. Established in 1966 and named for Andrew L. Spinas a long time Redwood City teacher and school superintendent who served on the Parks and Recreation Commission from 1938 to 1953.
 Dolphin Park – Turks Head/Quay Ln.
 Dove Beeger Park – Whipple Ave./Circle Rd.
 Fleishman Park – Locust St./McEvoy St.
 Garrett Park – 3600 Block Glenwood Ave. Named for George L. Garrett, Jr who was a Redwood City police officer killed in 1981.
 Hawes Park – Hudson St./Roosevelt Ave. Built in 1934 and named for Horace Hawes, state assemblyman, who in 1864 donated land and money to the city for a new school.
 Hoover Park – Woodside Rd./Spring St.
 Jardin de Niños – Middlefield Rd./Chestnut St.
 Linden Park – Linden St./Park St.
 Maddux Park – Maddux Dr./Kensington Rd.
 Mariner Park – Tiller Lane/Bridge Parkway
 Marlin Park – Neptune Dr./Cringle Dr.
 Mezes Park – Warren St./Standish St.  Named for Simon Mezes who donated the land in 1856.
 Palm Park – Hudson St./Palm Ave.
 Preserve Park – 99 Shearwater Parkway
 Red Morton Community Park – 1120 Roosevelt Ave.
 Sandpiper Park – Redwood Shores Parkway and Egret Ln.
 Shannon Park – Davit Lane/Shannon Way
 Shore Dogs Park – 1300 Block Radio Rd.
 Shorebird Park – Marine Parkway/Island Dr.
 Stafford Park – King St./Hopkins Ave. Established in 1946 and named for the donor, Daniel R. Stafford (1870–1948) who had been a Redwood City grocer, city clerk, and mayor.
 Stulsaft Park – 3737 Farm Hill Blvd. Established in 1951 and named for the real estate developer, Morris Stulsaft, who donated the land.
 Wellesley Crescent Park – Edgewood Rd./Arlington Rd.
 Westwood Park – Westwood St./Briarfield Ave.

Education
Redwood City has one state community college, Cañada College.

It has elementary and middle schools operated by both the Redwood City School District and the Belmont – Redwood Shores School District. At the high school level it is part of the Sequoia Union High School District and high schools in Redwood City that are part of this district are the comprehensive Sequoia High School, the charter schools Summit Preparatory Charter High School and Everest Public High School, and the continuation school Redwood High School. Many students from Redwood City attend another Sequoia Union school, Woodside High School, in the neighboring town of Woodside. The community of Redwood Shores is served by the Belmont - Redwood Shores School District and Carlmont High School.

The Redwood City Public Library, a member of the Peninsula Library System, has a Downtown Library and two neighborhood branch locations: Redwood Shores and Schaberg. The city's first library opened in 1865 and in 1900 the city passed a special tax to support a free public library. In 1904, Andrew Carnegie gave $10,000 for a new library; he gave another $6,000 to rebuild it after it was destroyed in the 1906 San Francisco earthquake. In 1959, the Schaberg Branch Library opened, funded by a bequest in the will of Hannah Schaberg, widow of former County Clerk Herman W. Schaberg. The Redwood Shores Branch Library was completed and opened to the public in 2008.

Transportation
U.S. Route 101 passes through Redwood City as it goes along the Peninsula. Other major thoroughfares include El Camino Real, Route 82; Woodside Rd, Route 84, and I-280, which passes west of the city. Redwood City has a stop on Caltrain, and local bus service is provided by SamTrans.

Slogan

Redwood City's slogan, emblazoned on arches across Broadway at the east and west entrances to downtown, is "Climate Best By Government Test". This is based on a climatological survey conducted by the United States and German governments prior to World War I. The area centered on Redwood City tied for the world's best climate with the Canary Islands and North Africa's Mediterranean Coast. The local paper had a contest for a city slogan to attract new residents and Wilbur Doxsee entered "By Government Test, Our Climate is Best" which won the $10 prize money in 1925.

Independence Day parade
Redwood City's Independence Day parade sponsored by the Peninsula Celebration Association, held continuously since 1939, has been billed variously as 'The largest Independence Day Parade in California', 'West of the Mississippi', or 'in North America', claims which may or may not be accurate. The first verifiable written records of celebrations date to 1861, and 1887 for a parade.

Media

Games
 The 3rd person Action Adventure Tomb Raider developer Crystal Dynamics is based in Redwood City.

Media companies
 Ampex Corporation, a pioneer and major developer of the audio recording, video recording, and data storage industries, headquartered management, engineering, and manufacturing in Redwood City for decades.
 Several DreamWorks animated films (e.g., Antz (1998), Shrek (2001), Shrek 2 (2004), and Madagascar (2005)) were made by PDI/DreamWorks (the Northern California branch of DreamWorks Animation), which moved to Redwood City from nearby Palo Alto (Park Drive) in October 2002.
 Video game publisher Electronic Arts is based in the Redwood Shores neighborhood of Redwood City.
 Formerly the home to the headquarters of the video game hardware/software developer Sega of America.
 ABS-CBN International, a subsidiary of the Filipino media conglomerate ABS-CBN Corporation is based in 150 Shoreline Drive.

Economy
Ampex, Avangate, BigBand Networks, BroadVision, Crystal Dynamics, DPR Construction,  Electronic Arts, GoFundMe, Informatica, iPass Inc., Jivox, Openwave, Oracle, Shutterfly, Support.com, Evernote, Equinix, i2c Inc, YuMe, and iCracked are based in Redwood City.

Additionally, All Nippon Airways operates an office in Suite 350 at 555 Twin Dolphin Drive in Redwood City. Until 1999 Sega operated its United States headquarters in Redwood City; during that year the headquarters moved to San Francisco. The 3DO Company, when it existed, had its headquarters in Redwood City. In addition to large tech companies, there is also a vibrant small business community in the town.

Cargill salt ponds

Cargill has operated salt ponds in Redwood City, and has proposed development of the ponds, resulting in demands for restoration of some of the land. The plans are currently stalled.

Top employers
 As of 2020, the top employers in the city were:

Sister cities
  Zhuhai, Guangdong, China, became a sister city in 1993. It was Redwood City's first.
  Colima, Colima, Mexico, became a sister city in 1998.
  Ciudad Guzman, Jalisco, Mexico, became a sister city in 2013.
  Qingyuan, Guangdong, China, became a friendship city in 2015.
  Aguililla, Michoacan, Mexico, became a sister city in 2017, after becoming a friendship city in 2013.

Notable people

Politicians
 Jon Huntsman Jr., American politician and diplomat
 Karl W. Hofmann, diplomat, ambassador and president of Population Services International
 William Royer, former mayor of Redwood City (1956-1960)

Sports

 Davante Adams, professional football wide receiver for the Las Vegas Raiders
 Kevin Bass, MLB right fielder for the Houston Astros and the San Francisco Giants
 Geoff Blum, MLB infielder and broadcaster
 Eric Byrnes, MLB outfielder
 Joe Biagini, MLB player for the Toronto Blue Jays
 Greg Camarillo, NFL wide receiver
 Chris Carter, MLB first baseman
 Jeff Clark, big wave surfer
 Daniel Descalso, MLB infielder
 Julian Edelman, NFL wide receiver, 3-time Super Bowl Champion, and the MVP of Super Bowl LIII
 Daniel Nava, MLB outfielder
 Brian Shima, professional inline skater
 Regan Smith, Olympic swimmer, record holder in 200m backstroke and 100m backstroke
 Zach Test (born 1989), rugby union player
 Matangi Tonga, American football player
 Roy Williams, 5x time NFL Pro Bowler
 Lily Zhang, Olympic table tennis player

Entertainment
 Cedric Bixler-Zavala, musician
 Linda Cardellini, actress
 Bela Lugosi, actor
 Joyce MacKenzie, actress
 Ross Malinger, actor
 Lydia Pense, musician and singer
 Chris Roberts, developer of Wing Commander
 Chelsi Smith (1973–2018), Miss USA 1995 & Miss Universe 1995 winner

See also

Seaport Centre
The Guardian sculpture

Notes

External links

 
 Port of Redwood City
 Downtown Redwood City
 San Mateo Daily Journal, a local newspaper
 The Spectrum Magazine – Redwood City's monthly magazine

 
1867 establishments in California
Butterfield Overland Mail in California
Cities in San Mateo County, California
Cities in the San Francisco Bay Area
County seats in California
Incorporated cities and towns in California
Populated places established in 1867
Populated coastal places in California